Timken OK Load is a standardized measurement that indicates the possible performance of extreme pressure (EP) additives in a lubricating grease or oil.  The units of measurement are pounds-force or kilograms-force. This measurement is performed using a special test machine and standard block and ring test specimens.

The test machine is based on a machine manufactured by the Timken Company from 1935 to 1972, It is now an industry recognized standard test to compare extreme pressure resistance of greases and oils in a reproducible way. 

It is not to be confused with some smaller lubricity testers that are also often erroneously called Timken: the confusion originates from a now obsolete Italian brand TIMPKEN.

The test machine consists of a standardized bearing race mounted on a tapered arbor rotating at high speed.  The race is brought into contact with a square steel test block under a constant load.  The contact area is flooded with the lubricant or grease being tested.  The Timken OK Load is the highest standard load at which the spinning bearing race produces no scouring mark on the test block, but only a uniform wear scar.

Timken OK Loads are listed on grease and oil property charts and are part of many specifications.  It was once generally assumed that the measure and the film strength of the lubricant were directly related.  Today, the primary purpose of the test is to determine whether EP additives are present and functioning.  A measure of 35 pounds (16 kilograms-force or 155 newtons) or more means that EP additives are present and working well.

The Timken OK Load test methods are ASTM D-2509 for greases and ASTM D-2782 for oils.

There are a few portable version of smaller tester utilizing similar test method for public demonstration or for product showcase. Example of smaller and portable version: www.linhphan.vn/timken

References

Mechanical engineering